"I Keep Forgettin' (Every Time You're Near)" (also known as "I Keep Forgettin") is a song released in 1982 by American singer-songwriter Michael McDonald, from his debut album If That's What It Takes. It was written by McDonald and Ed Sanford.

Similarity to Chuck Jackson's 1962 song "I Keep Forgettin", composed by Jerry Leiber and Mike Stoller, resulted in Leiber and Stoller also being given a songwriting credit for Michael McDonald's song.

Background 

Michael McDonald recorded it with his sister Maureen McDonald  providing background vocals. It was featured on If That's What It Takes, his first solo album away from The Doobie Brothers. Released as a single, it peaked at No. 4 on the U.S. Billboard Pop Singles charts, #7 R&B and #8 on the Adult Contemporary chart. Greg Phillinganes, Steve Lukather and Jeff Porcaro of the band Toto played the clavinet, guitar and drums respectively. Legendary bassist, Louis Johnson, from The Brothers Johnson laid down the song's pronounced bassline.

Influence, covers, and sampling 

McDonald's song was heavily sampled by Warren G on his hit 1994 single "Regulate", featuring Nate Dogg, and by Jadakiss on "Kiss Is Spittin'", which also features Nate Dogg. Young MC sampled it on his song "Love You Slow" of the album What's the Flavor?. Dave Hollister covers the song on his album Ghetto Hymns, where it's titled "Keep Forgettin'" and is slowed down noticeably but keeps the same lyrics. The song's chorus is interpolated by Moloko in an acoustic mix of their 2003 hit single "Familiar Feeling". The song's bassline also was sampled in the track "Next to You" by the 'Daytime Disco' Duo Poolside. Julia Fordham performed the song in duet with McDonald on her 2008 LP China Blue. In 2011, DJ and producer Solomun sampled the song on ''Love Recycled''. Laura Jane Grace, lead singer, songwriter and guitarist of Against Me!, performed a version of the song in April 2015 for A.V. Undercover series.

Personnel 

 Michael McDonald — lead vocals, electric piano, synthesizers
 Steve Lukather — guitar
 Greg Phillinganes — clavinet
 Louis Johnson — bass guitar
 Jeff Porcaro — drums
 Maureen McDonald — backing vocals

Chart history

Weekly charts

Year-end charts

In popular culture 

The song was also used during the Condoleezza Rice dance segment on You're Welcome America: A Final Night with George W. Bush.

The song is the primary plot device of, and gives its name to, an episode of Yacht Rock, which comedically fictionalized the events leading to Warren G sampling it.

References 

1982 debut singles
Michael McDonald (musician) songs
Male–female vocal duets
Songs written by Michael McDonald (musician)
Songs written by Jerry Leiber and Mike Stoller
Patti LaBelle songs
1982 songs
Song recordings produced by Ted Templeman
Warner Records singles

Farid Ouali idrissi production